Molina Devi (1917 —  13 August 1977), also known as Molina Debi and Malina Debi, was a Bengali Indian actress of Bengali and Hindi film and theatre. As an actress, she played a wide variety of parts, later frequently playing matronly parts, especially Rani Rashmoni, patroness of the 19th century Bengali mystic Sri Ramakrishna. She acted in several dozen films, mostly in Bengali and Hindi. With actor Gurudas Banerjee, she also directed a Calcutta-based theatre troupe, M. G. Enterprises.<ref
   name=calcutheaters></ref>

Early life
Molina Devi was born on 13 August 1917 in Calcutta.

Career
Molina Devi started her career as trainee under Aparesh Chandra Mukhopadhyay. She debuted in a silent film while at the age of 8. Thereafter worked as dancer in mythological and historical plays in the Bengali theatre in the 1920s, and later sometimes played roles as a young boy, such as the role of Dara in Jahangir (1929), and later played roles as a heroine.
She also performed some memorable roles in Hindi films. She took various roles, even vamps in her early career such as in Pramathesh Barua's Rajat Jayanti in 1939.

In 1954 she got a break through in Puran Bhagat and in 1955, Molina played the title role in the film Rani Rasmani. She also directed a Kolkata based theatre troupe, M. G. Enterprises. Molina worked in Rangana theatre as chief artist. She performed as a singer on radio and contributed for formation of Mahila Silpi Mahal, a welfare association for female artists of Bengal. For her contribution in the field of drama, she receives the Sangeet Natak Akademi Award.

Molina Devi and actor Gurudas Banerjee together they operated their own touring theatre, M. G. Enterprises, which "specialized in commercial productions of devotional drama" in which Banerjee played the role of Sri Ramakrishna and other holy men."

Molina Devi died on 13 August 1977 in Kolkata.

Roles
Molina Devi acted in a variety of roles, many times as Rani Rashmoni, which she played on both stage and in film.

From the 1950s through the 1970s, Molina Devi commonly portrayed Rani Rashmoni in the Bengali Theatre and films.

Sushil Mukherjee explains that the drama Jugadevata, which debuted on the Calcutta stage on 19 November 1948,

Films in which Molina Devi played the role of Rani Rashmoni included Rani Rashmoni (1955).
Theatrical plays in which she played Rani Rashmoni included Jugadebata (1948) and Thakur Sri Ramakrishna (1955).

Reception
According to Sushil Mukherjee, in the many screen and stage appearances since 1948 in which Molina Devi and Gurudas Banerjee have played Rani Rashmoni and Ramakrishna Dev together, they "have carried the audience with them in every performance."

In 1966, The Illustrated Weekly of India mentioned Molina Devi's troupe's performance in a review of the 1965-66 theatre season in Delhi.
The Weekly stated that

Theatre roles
The following table partially chronicles Molina Devi's stage career. It is not complete.

Film roles
Roles and details of selected films of Molina Devi appear in the table below. Films known to be dubbed versions of other films have not been listed. Any films known to be multilinguals (separately filmed in multiple languages) are explicitly noted as multilinguals.

Partial filmography
 Chirakumar Sabha (1932)
 Kapalkundala (1933)
 Rajrani Meera (1933)
 Puran Bhagat (film) (1933)
 Dulari Bibi (1933)
 Abhagin (1938)
 Manzil (1936)
 Karodpati (1936)
 Bardidi (1939)
 Matir Ghar (1944)
 Mane Na Mana (1945)
 Nandita (1945)
 Ramer Sumati (1947)
 Srinkhal (1947)
 Shesh Nibedan (1948)
 Vidyasagar (1950)
 Baikunther Will (1950)
 Sharey Chuattor (1953)
 Saat Number Kayedi (1953)
 Nabin Jatra (1953)
 Annapurnar Mandir (1954)
 Ora Thake Odhare (1954)
 Mantra Shakti (1954)
 Rani Rasmani (1955)
 Mahakavi Girish Chandra (1956)
 Ekti Raat (1956)
 Nilachaley Mahaprabhu (1957)
 Sree Sree Maa (1958)
 Indranath Srikanta O Annadadidi (1959)
 Saat Paake Bandha (1963)
 Bireswar Vivekananda (1964)
 Bon Palashir Padabali (1973)
 Debi Choudhrani (1974)
 Fuleswari (1974)
 Moyna (1978)

References

External links
 
 Molina Devi at CITWF

1917 births
1977 deaths
Actresses in Bengali cinema
Actresses in Hindi cinema
Indian women playback singers
Indian film actresses
20th-century Indian actresses
20th-century Indian singers
Actresses from West Bengal
20th-century Indian women singers
Recipients of the Sangeet Natak Akademi Award